Nicolas Bollado (born 18 October 2004) is an English professional footballer who plays as a forward for  club Derby County.

Career
Bollado was a youth-team player at Carlisle United when he impressed manager Paul Simpson during pre-season training in July 2022. He made his debut in the EFL Trophy on 20 September 2022, coming on as a 39th-minute substitute for Omari Patrick in a 1–1 draw with Fleetwood Town at Brunton Park.

Career statistics

References

2004 births
Living people
English footballers
Association football forwards
Carlisle United F.C. players
English Football League players